Zagoritis is a surname related to the region of Zagori. Notable people with the surname include:

Adrian Zagoritis (born 1968), British songwriter and record producer
Lefteris Zagoritis (born 1956), Greek lawyer and politician

Greek-language surnames